Deh-e Fatami (also Romanized as Deh-e Fāţamī) is a village in Margan Rural District, in the Central District of Hirmand County, Sistan and Baluchestan Province, Iran. At the 2006 census, its population was 24, in 6 families.

References 

Populated places in Hirmand County